Sunderland Albion Football Club was an English association football club based in Sunderland, England, formed in 1888 and disbanded in 1892. The club was reformed in 2020 but has as of 2023 ceased operations again.

Summary
Sunderland Albion were formed by some members of Sunderland A.F.C. who did not like the commercial direction the club was taking. The two clubs were fierce rivals – when they were drawn together in both the FA Cup and the Durham Challenge Cup in the 1888–89 season, Sunderland withdrew from both competitions rather than allow Albion to benefit from the increased gate receipts.  However, there was so much demand locally for the clubs to play each other that two friendly matches were arranged, both won by Sunderland: 2–0 on 1 December 1888, in front of 18,000 spectators and 3–2 on 12 January 1889, in front of 12,000 spectators.

Albion were founder members of the Football Alliance in 1889, but when Sunderland joined The Football League in 1890, Albion's crowds began to suffer. To try to gain extra support, Albion joined the Northern League as well, playing in both leagues in the 1890–91 season before concentrating on the latter. However, when Sunderland won the Football League title in 1891–92, Albion disbanded.

Introduction
In December 1887 Sunderland defeated Middlesbrough in an FA Cup tie. However Sunderland were subsequently disqualified from the rest of the tournament after it was revealed they had played ineligible professional players Monaghan, Richardson and Hastings, who had been "imported" from Dumfries for the match.

On 13 March 1888 Allan held a meeting at The Empress Hotel in Union Street to form Sunderland Albion. Seven Sunderland players would defect to Albion along with Sunderland AFC's first President, Alderman Potts. It is likely that the latter would have gone anyway when less than two months later the Committee of Sunderland AFC was reduced from 30 to 15 members.

The Middlesbrough debacle alluded to above has always been identified as a main reason for Allan leaving the Committee i.e. Allan and others had a general dissatisfaction about the direction in which the club was heading. Another factor cited for Allan leaving Sunderland AFC was a potential move away from Newcastle Road and problems with the lease that was due to expire on 13 May 1888.

The annual meeting of the Sunderland Association Football Club was held on 3 May 1888 in the Monkwearmouth Workman's Hall with Club President Councillor Robert Thompson occupying the chair.

James Allan was identified as being the Sunderland AFC Treasurer, although at this meeting Mr. Samuel Tyzack of the Monkwearmouth Ironworks was appointed Treasurer in place of Mr. James Allan, in effect ousting or replacing (depends on what stance you take) the SAFC's founder. There is no mention of Allan volunteering to leave SAFC nor of Sunderland AFC giving Allan a vote of thanks for all he had done for SAFC, nor of the founding of Sunderland Albion.

It can only be presumed that James Allan, as appointed SAFC Treasurer, was under an obligation to attend and present his figures. Not only that but as he had formed Albion less than two months previously its fair to assume that there could have been bad feeling even at that early stage of the rivalry, hence no thanks for Allan, who then became the first Secretary and Treasurer of the Sunderland Albion Club.

Albion would use Sunderland AFC's old Blue House Field ground for fixtures and the HQ for Albion would be at the Waverley Hotel in Norman Street, Hendon.

Big business had now taken over Sunderland AFC, but Albion were determined to make a name for themselves. Sunderland AFC's main problem at this time was how to fill a void left by the departure of seven players. Albion's first fixture was on 5 May 1888 against Shankhouse Blackwatch (which is nine miles north of Newcastle). This was a mere 48 hours after the 3 May 1888 meeting had finished.

Albion's first line-up for the game at the Ashville Ground was as follows: Stewart, Oliver, Gilmartin, Richardson, Moore, Baxter, Scott, Kilpatrick, Melville, Monaghan and Nugent.

Albion led 2–0 at half time and triumphed 3–0. Five of the Albion players were "imported" from Newcastle Club, Elswick Rangers, especially for the game.

History

1887–88

Following the Shankhouse Blackwatch game Albion defeated Newcastle West End. Whilst both victories were well merited and on face value surprising, given the infancy of Albion, it perhaps wasn't such a shock bearing in mind that the Albion combination was really Sunderland AFC all but in name.

Sunderland Albion were now backed by some wealthy individuals, most noticeably James Hartley, who along with his brother John owned the Wear Glass Works at Monkwearmouth, founded in 1837. The backing arose from James Allan's friendship with Hartley; they were neighbours, Allan living nearby in Whitehall Terrace. Furthermore, there is evidence to suggest that Albion were also backed by wealthy brewers: Jimmy Hannah, for example, became landlord of the Free Gardeners Arms in Williamson Terrace with the tenure taken over by John Rae. 

Sunderland AFC had given notice to quit the Newcastle Road ground in November 1887. Whilst no firm date was given for the move Sunderland would stay on at that venue until 1898.

1888–89

In September 1888 Allan's professional career changed as he moved from his teaching position at Thomas Street School to become the Headmaster at Hylton Road School on the South side of the River.

Sunderland Albion started off the season with 4 teams – Sunderland Albion, Albion Reserves and 2 Swift Teams. For the Reserves it was a successful season as they defeated Herbert Rangers in the Sports Senior Cup Final on 25 May 1889. A fifth team existed, in theory, as the Albion Committee played a Charity Match against Sunderland Liberal Association on 27 March 1889.

Albion's first team, like Sunderland's played a succession of friendly games in 1888–89, however the club's should have met four times during the season but actually played each other just twice.

1 December 1888: Sunderland and Sunderland Albion were drawn to play each other in the second round of the Durham Challenge Cup. Sunderland simply refused to play. The reason behind the walkover given to Albion was simple – Sunderland didn't want to give Albion any money and as a meeting between the sides was the most eagerly awaited contest in the town it would have drawn a massive crowd and made the Albion coffers swell, an unattractive proposition to Sunderland.

18 December 1888: Yet again both teams drew each other in a cup competition, this time the FA Cup 4th Qualifying round. Again Sunderland refused to play. Not only was this about starving Albion of much needed funds but it also meant that it scuppered Albion's plans to take the gate receipts, buy the Blue House Field, fence it off and charge a "gate". Sunderland could just about stomach the fact that everyone watched Albion's games for nothing.

It is supposed that one of the reasons that Sunderland moved from Newcastle Road later than intended and were desperate to stay at the venue was that if they had left whilst Albion were in existence then the latter could have taken up tenancy at Newcastle Road, charged a gate and been a real threat to SAFC.

However, such was the outcry about Sunderland refusing to meet Albion that eventually they had to relent. However, in agreeing to face them at Newcastle Road there would be a twist in the tale. Sunderland suggested that apart from £20 in expenses, both clubs should give the proceeds to Charity. Albion said no, but the match still went ahead. The match took place on the date of the original Durham Challenge Cup fixture 1 December 1888. A further factor in Sunderland not wishing to play Albion in a cup game was the fact that their Scottish players would have been ineligible and so they would have risked defeat by their junior neighbours. This wasn't palatable to the Sunderland Committee.

In advance of the 1 December game James Allan wrote to the Sunderland Secretary Mr. Wallace asking about ticket arrangements for the fixture.

Afterwards Albion once more pressed for a friendly match and once more Sunderland agreed, but only on the same conditions as before – the money went to Charity. This time Albion agreed and a local Councillor put up a trophy for the winners. In what was to become one of the most infamous games in the history of Sunderland AFC this fixture summed up what the relationship between the two clubs was all about, both feeling threatened by the other. Tensions ran high prior to the encounter. It was a very bitter occasion that saw the Albion team walk off the field and also saw their Brake stoned on the way from Newcastle Road into the Town. Several Albion players were injured and the police spoke with the teams after the game to get evidence that could be used as part of any criminal prosecution. James Allan was hit in the face by a projectile and needed medical treatment. The fallout from the match would last until the next month when an inquiry would be held.

1889–90

The Football League had been formed for the 1888–89 season with an original 12 members. In order to establish who would compete for the 1889–90 league championship the bottom 4 teams had to re-apply for election. Stoke (10 votes), Burnley (9), Derby County (8) and Notts County with 7 votes, duly made it an unchanged line-up. Mitchell St George's (5), Sheffield Wednesday (4), Bootle (2), Sunderland (2), Newton Heath (1), Grimsby, South Shore, Sunderland Albion and Nelson with not a solitary vote missed out. Sunderland Albion therefore became a founder member of the Football Alliance, whilst Sunderland AFC continued to play a series of friendly games. Both clubs took part in both the Durham Challenge Cup and FA Cup.

Albion's 1889–90 Football Alliance campaign was not without incident as their opening match at Darwen had to be replayed. It did not get much better in the FA Cup when Albion were disqualified after they fielded Donald McKechnie who was also registered in Scotland with Glasgow Port Vale. It got even worse when Albion were suspended for 2 weeks, from 10 February 1890, for paying travelling expenses to one of their players (not allowed). With Bishop Auckland refusing to change the 22 February Durham Challenge Cup game, Albion were therefore disqualified from the competition.

Albion's 2 v 0 victory against Birmingham St George's on 7 April 1890 was expunged from the record books and the match was ordered to be replayed. The Midlands team refused and so the 2 points were awarded to Sunderland Albion.

Following the end of the season, Long Eaton Rangers dropped out and went into the Midland League. Stoke came into the Northern Alliance for the 1890–91 season; with their place in the Football League being taken by Sunderland AFC.

In March 1890 Sunderland Albion Football & Athletic Company Limited was formed with capital of £3,000. Furthermore, the Blue House Field ground was expanded and now featured a cycle track. Allan was confident of entry into the Football League and the club readied itself for this.

Sunderland's application to join the Football League for the 1890–91 season was successful and was a blow to Albion's hopes of eclipsing the Town's oldest club. In response Albion decided to play in two leagues for 1890–91, the Football Alliance again and the Northern League.

1890–91

The relative strength of Sunderland Albion during the season was demonstrated when on 20 April 1891, four of their players were chosen to represent the Football Alliance against the Football League.

Stoke (7 votes) proceeded back into the Football League along with Darwen (7 votes). Both were successful in the end of season Football League voting system. Sunderland Albion dropped out of the Football Alliance. The three places were taken by Burton Swifts, Ardwick (Manchester City) and Lincoln City.

Albion's reached the last 16 of the FA Cup and it took Nottingham Forest three games, the final one played at the neutral Bramall Lane venue, to eliminate Albion. Sunderland AFC drew Nottingham Forest in the quarter final, defeated them 4–0 but were eliminated themselves by Notts County in the semi–final, which happened to also be played at Bramall Lane. Notts County lost to Blackburn Rovers in the final. Sunderland ended 7th in their first league season, not helped by a two-point deduction for playing the legendary goalkeeper Ned Doig, who was also registered with another club. In January 1891, Albion's Jimmy Hannah signed for Sunderland AFC. In doing so he became the only man ever to move in that direction.

1891–92

For the 1891–92 season Albion dispensed with competing in the Football Alliance due to the expense of paying the railway fares of visiting clubs, and entered the Northern League only. To raise much needed finance, Sunderland Olympic played at The Blue House Field when Albion were away.

Once more Albion had been eliminated from the FA Cup by Nottingham Forest. However more serious for Albion was at the start of the campaign. Although the Football League had been increased to 14 clubs Albion mustered only one vote in their attempt to gain entry for the 1891–92 version and therefore failed again.

By now the writing was on the wall for Albion. What didn't help, according to John Grayston, was the Albion Committee losing a week's income, which started to indicate that all was not well with the administration of the club. Struggling financially they would play, lose heavily to, Sunderland twice more:

Sunderland 6 v 1 Sunderland Albion, 18 April 1892
Sunderland Albion 0 v 8 Sunderland, 27 April 1892.

1892–93

Albion again applied to join the Football League for the 1892–93 season. However the day before the league meeting to vote new clubs into the league structure the Committee of Sunderland Albion met to wind up the club. Reluctantly therefore Sunderland Albion admitted defeat, withdrew their Football League application, and folded.

The Wear Glass Company, that in effect bankrolled Albion, endured a labour strike of some 18 months which crippled the company. As Hartley and the Glass Works was the major backer of Sunderland Albion, to the tune of £3k, the backing went AWOL, as a result of the strike. The company folded and, in effect, took Sunderland Albion with it.

Of the original 12 Football Alliance clubs only three, including Albion, had not gone on to gain entry into the Football League.

2020-present

The club re-formed in 2020 but ceased operations in 2022.

League record

FA Cup record

Seasons

Honours

League
Football Alliance 
Runners-up 1890–91

Cup
 Durham Challenge Cup: 1 
1889

Players
Jayden Hanlon 

Maroof Ahmed 

Morgan Armour

Simon Costella 

Ryan Docherty 

Adam Brown

Bradley Skinner 

Corey Welsh 

David Layton 

Ethan Woodward 

James Buglass 

Matthew Watson 

Ryan Hawyes 

Ryan Lindsay 

Shaun Ross 

Callum Reay 

Connor Crawford 

Haythem Tawfiq 

James Andrews 

Joe Bennett 

Joe Wardingham 

Josh Elliott 

Liam Clark 

Paul Storey 

Jack Dykes 

Shaun Ravenhall

Colours

The club wore white jerseys and navy knickerbockers originally, changing to all navy by 1892.

References
Specific

General
Association Football in Victorian England – A History of the Game from 1863 to 1900 by Philip Gibbons
The Battle For a Town, Sunderland AFC v Sunderland Albion by Paul Days
http://www.rokerpark.com/navbar/albion.html

External links
 
 

Football clubs in England
Association football clubs established in 1888
Association football clubs disestablished in 1892
Association football clubs established in 2020
Football clubs in Tyne and Wear
Sunderland A.F.C.
1888 establishments in England
1892 disestablishments in England
2020 establishments in England